Senza colpa! is a 1915 silent Italian drama film directed by Carmine Gallone.

Cast
 Francesco Cacace
 Eduardo D'Accursio
 Soava Gallone
 Augusto Mastripietri
 Gina Romani

References

External links
 

1915 films
1915 drama films
Italian silent feature films
Italian black-and-white films
Films directed by Carmine Gallone
Italian drama films
Silent drama films